Tornatinidae is a family of very small sea snails, barrel-bubble snails, marine opisthobranch gastropod molluscs. These are headshield slugs, in the superfamily Bulloidea.

Genera
Genera within the family Tornatinidae include:
 Acteocina Gray, 1847
Genera brought into synonymy:
 Actaeocina [sic]: synonym of Acteocina Gray, 1847
 Didontoglossa Annandale, 1924: synonym of Acteocina Gray, 1847
 Tornatina A. Adams, 1850: synonym of Acteocina Gray, 1847
 Utriculastra Thiele, 1925: synonym of Acteocina Gray, 1847

References

  Oskars T.R., Bouchet P. & Malaquias M.A. (2015). A new phylogeny of the Cephalaspidea (Gastropoda: Heterobranchia) based on expanded taxon sampling and gene markers. Molecular Phylogenetics and Evolution. 89: 130-150

External links